Christian Büchting (born 23 January 1937) is a German former field hockey player. He competed in the men's tournament at the 1960 Summer Olympics.

References

External links
 

1937 births
Living people
German male field hockey players
Olympic field hockey players of the United Team of Germany
Field hockey players at the 1960 Summer Olympics
People from Wernigerode
Sportspeople from Saxony-Anhalt